Last Chance Records is a Little Rock, Arkansas-based independent record label specializing in Americana, and indie rock. The label was founded by and is owned by Travis Hill.

Roster
 Adam Faucett
 Andrew Bryant
 Austin Lucas
 Bap Kennedy
 Brent Best
 Drag the River
 JKutchma
 John Paul Keith
 Kevin Kerby
 Micah Schnabel
 Motel Mirrors
 Roger Hoover
 The Small Ponds
 Two Cow Garage
 American Aquarium
 Glossary
 John Moreland

References

External links
 

2007 establishments in Arkansas
Alternative rock record labels
American independent record labels
Companies based in Little Rock, Arkansas
Indie rock record labels
Music companies of the United States
Record labels established in 2007